USS Milledgeville (PF-98) was a United States Navy  authorized for construction during World War II but cancelled before construction could begin.

Milledgeville originally was authorized as a patrol gunboat with the hull number PG-206, but she was redesignated as a patrol frigate with the hull number PF-98 on 15 April 1943.

Plans called for Milledgeville to be built under a Maritime Commission contract by the American Shipbuilding Company at Lorain, Ohio, as a Maritime Commission Type T. S2-S2-AQ1 hull. However, the contract for her construction for the U.S. Navy was cancelled on 31 December 1943 prior to the laying of her keel.

On 7 February 1944, the cancelled Milledgevilles incomplete sister ship, the Tacoma-class patrol frigate USS Sitka (PF-94) was renamed USS Milledgeville (PF-94).

References 

 NavSource Online Frigate (PF) Index
 

Tacoma-class frigates
Cancelled ships of the United States Navy